Heinz Inniger (born 18 December 1980) is a Swiss snowboarder. He ranked 4th in Parallel Slalom at the World Cup 2004/2005.

External links 
 Heinz-Inniger.ch
 

1980 births
Swiss male snowboarders
Olympic snowboarders of Switzerland
Snowboarders at the 2006 Winter Olympics
Living people
21st-century Swiss people